{{Infobox school
 | name                    = LaSalle High School
 | image                   = La_Salle_High_School_(Cincinnati,_Ohio)_Logo.svg
 | image_size              = 200px
 | caption                 = Preserving Tradition, Advancing Our Future
 | motto                   = Latin:Corpus-Mens-AnimaEnglish:Body-Mind-Soul | established             = 
 | type                    = Private, Catholic, All-boys college preparatory
 | religion                = Roman Catholic(Christian Brothers)
 | authority               = Roman Catholic Archdiocese of Cincinnati
 | grades                  = 9th–12th
 | enrollment              = 519
 | enrollment_as_of        = 2022–23
 | principal               = Aaron Marshall
 | athletics               = 
 | sports                  =  Baseball Basketball Volleyball Football Soccer Lacrosse Ice-Hockey  Bowling Cross-Country Golf Swimming Diving Tennis Track and Field Wrestling 
 | athletics_conference    = Greater Catholic League South
 | colors                  =  and 
 | patron                  = St. Jean-Baptiste de La Salle
 | mascot                  = Lancer
 | location                = 3091 North Bend Road
 | city                    = Cincinnati
 | county                  = (Hamilton County)
 | state                   = Ohio
 | zipcode                 = 45239
 | country                 = USA
 | coordinates             = 
 | homepage                = 
}}

La Salle High School is a Catholic, all-male, archdiocesan high school in Cincinnati, Ohio. The school was opened September 6, 1960, and was named in honor of Jean-Baptiste de La Salle, a French priest , and educational reformer. The school was officially dedicated on May 14, 1961. It was founded by the Institute of the Brothers of the Christian Schools.

 Academics 
The curriculum is accredited by the Ohio Department of Education and the Ohio Catholic School Accrediting Association. Curriculum levels are Lasallian Scholars Institute (LSI), Honors Program studies, Advanced College Preparatory studies, College Preparatory studies, and Individualized studies.

Students are required to pass all parts of the Ohio Graduation Test in order to receive a diploma.

 Laptop program 
In the fall of 2010, freshmen and sophomores were issued tablet computers. Students are able to take handwritten notes in Microsoft OneNote, submit assignments and check grades online, as well as communicate with their teachers directly via email.

In preparation for its laptop program, the school installed a Cisco wireless network, Moodle course management system, PowerSchool student information system, and implemented its own private cloud infrastructure with Hyper-V.

 Language requirements 
Students in the Honors or Advanced College Preparatory programs are required to take at least two consecutive courses in the same foreign language during their freshman and sophomore years. All other students who choose to start a foreign language are subject to the same requirement.

 Spirituality 
Every student is required to make a school-sponsored Kairos retreat and complete a minimum of sixty hours of Christian Service outside of regular school hours in order to graduate. At least half of those hours must directly involve working for the homeless, poor, crippled, sick, elderly or others struggling in their lives. The remaining hours can also involve activities such as work at parish, festival, park, school, or other community related activities.

 Canned food drive 
La Salle High School hosts an annual Truck Full of Love canned food drive. In 2007, a record 76,000 cans were collected for Little Sisters of the Poor in Clifton.

 The La Salle Drama Program 
The La Salle Drama Program's awards include the 2007 State Championship for their Fall production of "1776" and an area conference win for their 2008 Fall production "Damn Yankees" (which was also nominated for Best Musical at the Cincinnati Cappies 2009 awards gala).  La Salle was nominated for 11 Cappies for this show, but sadly won none. Their 2010 Spring production of "Aida" was nominated for many Cappie awards and won two. In 2011, their fall play "Teahouse of the August Moon" was chosen to be performed full-length at the EdTA Ohio State Conference, and in 2012 the fall musical "All Shook Up" had the honor of performing an hour-long portion of the show. In 2013, LaSalle Drama's production "The Outsiders" was also chosen to perform a full-length show at the EdTA Ohio State Conference.  The department's production of "The 25th Annual Putnam County Spelling Bee" was also selected to perform a full-length show at the conference in 2022.

There are two types of productions put on at La Salle, one being a "Black Box Production" (which is held in the Black Box theater) and the other being a "Main Stage Production" (which is held on the stage in the gymnasium). In addition to regular productions, La Salle puts on an annual "Passion Play", as well as student-directed One Act plays. The Passion Play is held near Easter to commemorate the life and the Passion of Jesus Christ. The student-directed One Act plays provide an opportunity for students to experience being involved in producing and directing a show chosen by them. 

 Clubs and organizations 
There are over forty clubs and organizations available to students at La Salle High School.

 Key Club 
Key Club is an international student-led organization which facilitates student community service. Students in Key Club are expected to complete a minimum of 15 hours of community service in Key Club-sponsored activities by the end of May each year. These hours can count towards the student's graduation requirement.

 Band 
La Salle's band program has seen much success in recent years. Under the direction of Angelo Sylvester, the Pride of La Salle marching band has had three consecutive top-three finishes in class at adjudicated Mid-States Band Association events (most recently earning the title in Class AA), as well as being a Bands of America Grand Nationals Semi-finalist for two years running. La Salle's Wind Ensemble has also received a Superior rating in classes C, B, and A consecutively at adjudicated OMEA events.  Additionally, La Salle's Winter Guard program has received high accolades in recent years in not only Tri-State Circuit events, but also at Winter Guard International. The Winter Guard is a WGI Cincinnati Regional Finalist, as well as a WGI World Championships Semi-finalist.

 Athletics 
The Lancers compete in the Greater Catholic League GCL The Lancers compete in the following sports Baseball, Basketball, Bowling, Cross-Country, Football, Golf, Ice-Hockey, Soccer, Swimming and Diving, Tennis, Track and Field, Volleyball, and Wrestling.

Team state championships

 Basketball −1996, 2011
 Cross Country – 2005, 2006
 Track and Field – 1994, 2011
 Football – 2014, 2015, 2016, 2019

 Notable alumni 

 Athletics
Drue Chrisman - professional football punter, Cincinnati Bengals
Mick Cronin (1990) – head coach, UCLA Bruins men's basketball
Zach Day (1996) – professional baseball pitcher, Washington Nationals and Colorado Rockies
Jerry Doerger (1978) – professional football offensive tackle, Chicago Bears
Mark Fischer (1993) – professional football center, Washington Redskins
Don Hasselbeck (1973) – professional football tight end, New England Patriots
Dave LaFary (1973) – professional football offensive tackle, New Orleans Saints
Tom Luken (1968) – professional football guard, Philadelphia Eagles
Sam McConnell (1994) – MLB player, Atlanta Braves
Darryl Meadows (1979) – professional football player, Houston Oilers
Tim Naehring – professional baseball infielder, Boston Red Sox
DeVier Posey – professional football wide receiver, Houston Texans
Julian Posey  – professional football cornerback, New York Jets
Bill Schmitz – head football coach, United States Coast Guard Academy
Brent Celek – professional football tight end, Philadelphia Eagles
Tyler Sheehan – professional football quarterback, Cincinnati Commandos
Chris Smith (1981) – Kansas City Chiefs running back
 Entertainment
Joshua LeBar – actor, Entourage''

 Politics
Louis W. Blessing, Jr. (1966) – Ohio State Representative and Senator
Steve Chabot (1971) – U.S. Representative, 1st district

 Clergy
Joseph R. Binzer (1973) – Auxiliary Bishop, Archdiocese of Cincinnati

References

Educational institutions established in 1960
High schools in Hamilton County, Ohio
Private schools in Cincinnati
Catholic secondary schools in Ohio
Boys' schools in Ohio
1960 establishments in Ohio
Lasallian schools in the United States
Roman Catholic Archdiocese of Cincinnati